WR 140 is a visually moderately bright Wolf-Rayet star placed within the spectroscopic binary star, SBC9 1232, whose primary star is an evolved spectral class O4-5 star. It is located in the constellation of Cygnus, lying in the sky at the centre of the triangle formed by Deneb, γ Cygni and δ Cygni.

Significance 
WR 140 is thought to be a prototypical example of cosmic dust production. In this mode of cosmic dust production, detritus enriched in silicon and carbon is periodically blown into the wider universe by certain stars toward the end of their lives. Such stars are termed Wolf-Rayets.   

The outermost layers of a Wolf-Rayet star are enriched in oxygen, nitrogen, silicon and carbon. Indeed, the spectrographic presence of these elements, along with a notable absence of hydrogen, were one of the original diagnostic criteria for classifying a star as Wolf-Rayet. It is these enriched layers of the photosphere that are lost in repeating pulses. Once distant from the surface, the carbon fraction of this ejected material begins to glow at approximately 1000 K. The heating is due to the star's UV radiation, the wavelength of its greatest luminosity. This has the effect of rebroadcasting the star's UV radiation in the infrared, and it is this that is detected by suitable telescopes. The rebroadcast of the star's UV radiation by carbon and other metals traveling away from its surface creates the signature of a Wolf-Rayet: broad emission spectra rather than the far more common absorption spectra.

Binary System Characteristics 

WR 140 has been described as the brightest Wolf-Rayet star in the northern hemisphere, although WR 133 also in Cygnus is comparably bright. Being less massive, less luminous, and probably less visually bright than its primary the Wolf-Rayet component is identified as the secondary star, despite the fact that it dominates the spectrum with its broad emission lines. The primary star is an O4-5 star, most likely a giant or supergiant. Its current accepted spectroscopic orbit is highly eccentric and has an orbital period of 7.9 ± 0.2 years, which has been determined from the velocity variations observed with the component's spectral lines, mostly from the Balmer absorption lines of the O4-5 primary and C IV emission lines at 465.0 nm for WR 140. Separation between these two stars varies from 1.3 AU at periastron to 23.9 AU at apastron. 

WR 140 is listed as a Wolf-Rayet variable star, and has been given the variable star designation V1687 Cyg in the General Catalogue of Variable Stars, whose visual brightness varies only very slightly. Interest with this WR 140 system is principally observing the infrared light fluctuations during the component's orbit, being extensively studied because of its episodic dust formation. It is now regarded as the prototype colliding-wind binary. 

Shortly after periastron passage every eight years, the infrared brightness increases dramatically and then slowly drops again over a period of months. Here stellar winds collide with the dust formation created by the Wolf-Rayet star, causing the unusual bulges and angles in the concentric shells of dust. The dust typically emitted by Wolf-Rayet systems is not so coherent or concentric as those of WR 140. The dust lanes around Wolf-Rayets are most commonly observed as some variety of spiral. This is thought to be the result of the dueling solar winds in binary systems, which compress clouds of dust into distinct shock fronts. The concentric nature of WR 140's dust shells is not well understood, although it may be related to nuclear processes in the Wolf-Rayet star's core.

Mechanism of Dust Production 
While interactions between the two stellar winds of the stars that orbit one another in WR 140 may be responsible for concentrating dust into discrete bands, it is not known how the concentric shells are formed. It is thought that nuclear processes in the Wolf-Rayet star may contribute an unusual degree of coherence to dust emissions.

As the Wolf-Rayet star in WR 140 neared the end of its short life its core ran out of hydrogen to fuse into helium. With the loss of the radiation pressure this fusion provided, the balance that determines the radii of all stars shifted decisively towards gravitational collapse. The Wolf-Rayet star began to lose volume as its own gravitational contraction compacted its cooler interior.  

This collapse eventually began to slow as it grew more intense and heated the star's interior. Along the edge of the core a thin shell experienced temperatures and pressures sufficient to begin helium fusion. This helium burning provided a burst of radiation pressure that propagated through the star, up to its surface. The star began to inflate, though this increase in size was only temporary. The thin shell of helium fusion eventually caused enough expansion to moderate, or even extinguish its own reaction. The star once again began to collapse.   

However, at the surface this loss of internal radiation pressure had the effect of blowing the outermost layers of the star's photosphere into space. Following this, the star began to fuse helium at a greater rate and temporarily regained its former radiation pressure. This helium fusion once again stalled, and the subsequent gravitational collapse dislodged another layer of photosphere into space. These pulses will continue as long as this cycle of intermittent helium fusion can repeat itself.  

The cast-off materials are essentially extremely large injections of cosmic dust into the star's stellar wind, which then carries it away from the star at several hundred kilometers per second. It is not well understood whether the unusual concentricity of WR 140's dust is due to interactions between the two stellar winds or is the result of nuclear processes in the Wolf-Rayet member.   

The immense surface temperature of Wolf-Rayet stars (up to 210,000 K) produces intense ultraviolet radiation, enough to make 20 or more layers visible to instrumentation. The distance between the concentric shells of ejected material corresponds to the time between one faltering of the star's helium burning and another. This period is close to eight years, with new emissions having been observed in 1985, 1993, 2001, and 2009. One estimate places the distance between shells at around 1.4 trillion km, meaning that if the Sun were such a Wolf-Rayet star one shell would be well into the Oort Cloud and around 5% of the way to Alpha Centauri before another shell were cast off. As seen in the JWST image at top right these intervals can be highly stable, continuing over many decades or hundreds of years.

References

Further reading

Cygnus (constellation)
Wolf–Rayet stars
J20202798+4351164
193793
Spectroscopic binaries
Cygni, V1687
BD+43 3571
100287
O-type stars